Caishikou is a neighborhood in Beijing, situated in Xicheng District.

Part of it, known as Caishikou Execution Grounds (菜市口法场), was where most of Beijing's capital punishments were carried out during the Qing Dynasty and were open to public viewing.

Caishikou is served by Caishikou Station, on lines 4 and 7 of the Beijing Subway.

References

Neighbourhoods of Beijing
Execution sites in China
Xicheng District